Terrell Wilks (born December 30, 1989) is an American sprinter who specializes in the 100 and 200 metres. He competed for University of Florida and had numerous All American Honors. He then signed a professional contract with Saucony

A native of New Haven, Connecticut, Wilks attended Hillhouse High School where he won several state championships.

Personal bests

References

External links

Official bio at Florida
From Zero to 60: Florida's Terrell Wilks

1989 births
Living people
American male sprinters
Florida Gators men's track and field athletes